Comitas waihaoensis is an extinct species of sea snail, a marine gastropod mollusc in the family Pseudomelatomidae..

Description

Distribution
This extinct marine species was found in New Zealand.

References

 A.W.B. Powell (1942), The New Zealand Recent and Fossil Mollusca of the family Turridae with general notes on Turrid nomenclature and systematics
 Maxwell, P.A. (2009). Cenozoic Mollusca. Pp 232-254 in Gordon, D.P. (ed.) New Zealand inventory of biodiversity. Volume one. Kingdom Animalia: Radiata, Lophotrochozoa, Deuterostomia. Canterbury University Press, Christchurch.

waihaoensis
Gastropods of New Zealand